Santwana Bordoloi is a director, actress, radio host and paediatrician from Assam, India. Both her directorial ventures, Adajya (1996) and Maj Rati Keteki (2017), set two decades apart, have won a National Award for the Best Feature Film in Assamese. Santwana Bordoloi started her career as an actor. She featured in popular TV series "Tejaal Ghora". This Series was directed by one of the renowned directors Kulada Kumar Bhattacharyya.

Career 
Dr Santwana Bordoloi is a paediatrician by profession and works at the Dispur Hospital. In 1996, she made her directorial debut with Adajya (The Flight). The film is based on Indira Goswami’s (Mamoni Raisom Goswami's) novel, Dontal Haatir Uiye Khowa Haoda (The Moth Eaten Howdah of a Tusker), and it won the National Award for Best Feature Film in Assamese, and also was showcased at various international film festivals. She took just about a month to make the film while juggling her medical clinic on the slide.

The two-decade gap in her films gave her critics the space to call her a "one-film wonder". However, she came out with Maj Rati Keteki in 2017, which also won an award for Best Assamese Feature Film at the 2017 National Awards. Film star Adil Hussain won Nargis Dutta Award – Special Mention (feature film) at 64th National Film Awards for acting in this film.

References

External links
 

Living people
Actresses in Assamese cinema
Indian film actresses
Actresses from Assam
Film directors from Assam
Assamese-language film directors
20th-century Indian film directors
Screenwriters from Assam
21st-century Indian film directors
1978 births
20th-century Indian women